Leonard Mandel (May 9, 1927 – February 9, 2001) was an American physicist who contributed to the development of theoretical and experimental modern optics and is widely considered one of the founding fathers of the field of quantum optics. With Emil Wolf he published the highly regarded book Optical Coherence and Quantum Optics.

Life 
Mandel was born in Berlin, Germany, where his father, Robert (Naftali) Mandel, had emigrated from Eastern Europe. 

He received a BSc degree in mathematics and physics in 1947 and a PhD degree in nuclear physics in 1951 from Birkbeck College, University of London, in the United Kingdom. He became a technical officer at Imperial Chemical Industries Ltd in Welwyn, UK, in 1951. In 1955, he became a lecturer and, later, senior lecturer at Imperial College London, University of London. He remained at Imperial until 1964, when he joined the University of Rochester as a professor of physics.

Mandel became Lee DuBridge Professor Emeritus of Physics and Optics at the University of Rochester when he died at the age of 73 at his home in Pittsford, New York.

Mandel published over 260 scientific papers dealing with problems of optical coherence, lasers, quantum interactions and non-classical states of light.  Together with Prof. Emil Wolf, Mandel organized a series of international conferences, known as the Rochester Conferences on Coherence and Quantum Optics, which were extremely influential in the history of the field of quantum optics.  Mandel was a referee for approximately 24 scientific journals and 6 research agencies.  He was on the Board of Directors of the Optical Society of America from 1985-1988, and was Associate Editor of the Journal of the Optical Society 1970-1976 and 1982-1983.  Mandel was also a member of the Editorial Board for both Physical Review and Quantum Optics.  In addition to his ground-breaking research, Mandel was known as an exceptional teacher and in 1992 he was awarded the Faculty Graduate Teaching Award by the University of Rochester.

Influence
As written by Jeff Kimble and Emil Wolf in Physics Today:

Awards
Mandel was a Fellow of the Optical Society of America and of the American Physical Society and received the following awards:

 1982 - Max Born Award - Mandel was the first recipient of the Max Born prize awarded by the Optical Society of America.
 1987 - Marconi Medal, awarded by the Italian National Research Council.
 1989 – Thomas Young Medal and Prize,  for distinguished research in the field of optics
 1993 – Frederic Ives Medal, Recognizing overall distinction in optics
1994 - Elected Member of the New York Academy of Sciences
1996 - Elected Member of the American Academy of Arts and Sciences
2001 - Elected Member of the National Academy of Sciences (posthumously)

See also
 Hong–Ou–Mandel effect
 Mandel Q parameter

References

External links

Obituary in the University of Rochester News
Obituary at The New York Times

1927 births
2001 deaths
Academics of Imperial College London
University of Rochester faculty
Alumni of Birkbeck, University of London
Optical physicists
Fellows of Optica (society)
German emigrants to the United Kingdom
British expatriates in the United States